Littoraria tessellata is a species of sea snail, a marine gastropod mollusk in the family Littorinidae, the winkles or periwinkles. The maximum recorded shell length is 23 mm.

References

Littorinidae
Gastropods described in 1847